Patrick Thrall is an American rock guitarist. Thrall began his recording career in 1972. He played guitar, vocals, and percussion with the group Cookin' Mama, which had his brother, Preston Thrall, on percussion. They released the album New Day in 1972.

Thrall was born and raised in Alameda, California. Starting as a drummer at 11, then moving to guitar at 13, by age 15 he joined the Alameda band "Cookin’ Mama". The band had some success in the San Francisco Bay Area and released the album "New Day" in 1972. At age 18 Thrall was involved in the first ever instructional book for rock guitar titled "Improvising Rock Guitar Vol 1".

Career

Thrall has worked with former Deep Purple bassist Glenn Hughes on the Hughes/Thrall project, and was a member of the Pat Travers Band during the peak of their success. He co-wrote one of Pat Travers' biggest hits, a hard-driving tune titled "Snortin' Whiskey", which became one of the most requested songs on American radio in 1980. Thrall later joined Asia, and played lead guitar for Meat Loaf during that artist's major comeback in the 1990s.

He began attracting attention as a guitarist in 1976 after the release of "Automatic Man" (signed by Chris Blackwell-Island Records), a band that was put together by former Santana drummer, Michael Shrieve. The band recorded their first album in London with Keith Harwood producing (Led Zeppelin Presence, The Rolling Stones Black and Blue). In 1978, Thrall was chosen for the co-lead spot with Pat Travers. He recorded three LP's with Travers: Heat In The Street, Go For What You Know and Crash And Burn.  Their first hit was "Boom Boom Out Goes The Lights". The latter LP featured the hit "Snortin' Whiskey", which Thrall co-wrote with Travers.

Thrall came to the attention of Glenn Hughes; the chemistry between the two clicked immediately when they formed Hughes/Thrall in 1981 in Los Angeles. The album was co-produced by Andy Johns and Rob Fraboni. The record was not a commercial success but furthered Thrall's reputation with many musicians at the time citing the Hughes/Thrall record as a major inspiration. Gary Moore gave Thrall a nod crediting him for "inspiration" on the Gary Moore & G-Force album.

After the demise of Hughes/Thrall he moved to New York and worked as a studio musician and as a sideman touring with major artists. He recorded two albums with the Jamaican rhythm section Sly and Robbie.  He played on the Tina Turner album "Foreign Affair" and was featured on the classic "Simply The Best".

In 1988, Thrall toured and recorded with the legendary Jack Bruce of Cream fame. The performance at The Bitter End in New York City was historic as it reunited Jack Bruce and Eric Clapton for the first time since the last Cream concert at the Royal Albert Hall. He recorded and toured with Meat Loaf on his 1993 comeback record "Bat Out of Hell II" which was one of the biggest albums of the year with the hit "I Would Do Anything for Love".

After recording two more albums and after several tours Thrall left Meat Loaf in 1996 and opened one of the first Pro Tools based production suites at Avatar studios in New York City. The technology was in its infancy but Thrall saw the incredible possibilities and put together a mobile system that could be taken to the other studios at Avatar. Thrall found his niche and success as producer and engineer, becoming a technology leader, pioneering the use of Pro Tools for studio recordings. He has also lent his talent and support to initiatives such as Nelson Mandela's foundation to fight AIDS in Africa.

Between 2007 and 2011, he worked with producers Tricky Stewart and The-Dream, who were responsible for Rihanna's "Umbrella", Justin Bieber's "Baby", Beyonce's "Single Ladies", Mariah Carey's "Touch My Body", and Jay Z's "Holy Grail". Since 2014, he has continued to work on such projects as Demi Lovato's version of "Let It Go"; Celine Dion and Stevie Wonder's duet of "Overjoyed", and many songs with Jessie J, including the duet with Tom Jones, "You've Lost That Lovin' Feeling".

Discography

Cookin Mama
 New Day (guitar, vocals, percussion; 1972)

Stomu Yamashta
 Go (guitar; 1976)

Delroy Washington - I-Sus
 "Generation Game", "Freedom Fighters" (lead guitar; 1976)

Automatic Man
 Automatic man (guitar, vocals; 1976)
 Visitors (guitar; 1977)

Alphonso Johnson
 Spellbound (guitar; 1977)

Pat Travers Band
 Heat in the Street (guitar; 1978)
 Live! Go for What You Know (guitar; 1979)
 Crash and Burn (guitar; 1980)
 Radio Active (guitar; 1981)
 Live in Concert (guitar; 1980)

Hughes/Thrall
 Hughes/Thrall (guitar, guitar synthesizer; 1982)

Dan Aykroyd & Tom Hanks
 City Of Crime - from Dragnet (1987) (guitar; 1987)

Sly and Robbie
 Rhythm Killers (guitar; 1987)

Asia
 Live in Moscow (guitar; 1990)
 Now Nottingham Live (guitar)

Meat Loaf
 Bat Out of Hell II: Back into Hell (guitar, percussion; 1992)
 Welcome to the Neighborhood (guitar; 1995)
 Live Around the World (guitar; 1996)

Glenn Hughes
 Feel (guitar, co-producer; 1995)

Praxis
 Mold (guitar; 1998)

Joe Satriani
 Engines of Creation (bass; 2000)

MTV's Wuthering Heights
 MTV's Wuthering Heights (guitar, co-producer; 2003)

Kim Plainfield & Lincoln Goines
 Night and Day (guitar; 2002)

References

External links
 Biography on the official homepage of Pat Thrall and Glenn Hughes

1950s births
American rock guitarists
American male guitarists
Asia (band) members
Neverland Express members
Living people
Guitarists from San Francisco
People from Alameda, California
20th-century American guitarists
Automatic Man members